"Hero" is a song by American rapper Nas, released June 2008 as the lead single from his untitled album. The song, which features vocals from American R&B singer Keri Hilson, was produced by Polow da Don.

Background
After claiming that hip hop had died on his previous album, Nas raps on "Hero" about stepping up and bringing it back. The third verse of the song addresses the controversy surrounding the album, originally titled Nigger: It's Universal apartheid, I'm hogtied, the corporate side
Blocking y'all from goin' to stores and buyin' it
First L.A. [Reid] and Doug Morris was riding with it
But Newsweek article startled bigwigs; they said, "Nas, why is you tryin' it?"
My lawyers only see the Billboard charts as winning
Forgetting, Nas the only true rebel since the beginning 
Still in musical prison, in jail for the flow
Try telling Bob Dylan, Bruce [Springsteen], or Billy Joel they can't sing what's in they soul!
So untitled it is
I never changed nothing, but, people, remember this
If Nas can't say it, think about these talented kids
With new ideas, being told what they can and can't spit
I can't sit and watch it, so shit I'ma drop it!
Like it or not, you ain't got to cop it
I'm a hustla in the studio, cups of Don Julio
No matter what the CD called, I'm unbeatable y'all!

The reference to Doug Morris, then the chairman and CEO of the Universal Music Group, is preserved in the version of "Hero" that appeared on The Nigger Tape, a mixtape released in the run-up to the untitled album's release. In the album version of "Hero," the lyric "Doug Morris" is censored.

Music video
The music video premiered on BET on July 7, 2008. It features the Audi R8. Keri Hilson and Ken Jenkins both make appearances in the video. The video appeared at #63 on BET's Notarized: Top 100 Videos of 2008 countdown. It was directed by Taj Stansberry.

Track listing
CD single
 "Hero" featuring Keri Hilson (Clean)
 "Hero" featuring Keri Hilson (Dirty)
 "Hero" featuring Keri Hilson (Instrumental)

Remixes and in other media
The song is featured in the racing game Midnight Club: Los Angeles.
An uncensored version of the song is featured on Nas and DJ Green Lantern's mixtape, The Ni**er Tape.
 America's Best Dance Crew Season 3 winners Quest Crew performed to a remix of this song on their first week on the show.
 Chamillionaire released a freestyle of this song before the release of Mixtape Messiah 4. It was originally intended to be a throwaway, but was released on the said mixtape. 
 Wiz Khalifa released a freestyle of this song titled "Hero (Freestyle)" on his 2008 mixtape Star Power.

Charts

References

External links
 "Hero" music video

2008 singles
Keri Hilson songs
Nas songs
Song recordings produced by Polow da Don
Songs written by Nas
Songs written by Polow da Don
Songs written by Nelly